Joe Meek (1929–1967) was an English record producer, musician, sound engineer and songwriter.

Joe Meek may also refer to:

Joseph Meek (1810–1875), mountain man
Joe Meek (footballer) (1910–1976), English footballer

See also 
A Life in the Death of Joe Meek